Itumeleng Shopane (born 16 June 1997) is a South African professional footballer who plays as a centre forward for National First Division side Swallows on loan from Kaizer Chiefs B.

Club career

Kaizer Chiefs B
In 2016, Shopane joined South Africa's PSL Reserve League side Kaizer Chiefs B, then in 2017 he was loaned to National First Division (NVD) side Cape Town All Stars.

International career

South Africa U20
He played at the 2016 COSAFA U-20 Cup and the 2017 Africa U-20 Cup of Nations.

South Africa U23
On 1 November 2019, Shopane was called up by coach David Notoane to join the South Africa national under-23 football team during the 2019 Africa U-23 Cup of Nations that was held in Egypt.

References

External links
 

Living people
1997 births
South African soccer players
South Africa under-20 international soccer players
Association football forwards
Cape Town All Stars players
Moroka Swallows F.C. players
National First Division players
2019 Africa U-23 Cup of Nations players